You Don't Know Jack is a video game developed by Starsphere and published by Sierra for the PlayStation in 1999.

Reception

The game received favorable reviews according to the review aggregation website GameRankings. Chris Charla of NextGen said, "With support for three players (the multi-tap is supported, but three can play with two controllers) and two discs of questions, this game should rival PaRappa as one of the best PlayStation party games around." Some other magazines gave it favorable reviews months before the game was released Stateside.

Notes

References

External links
 

1999 video games
Party video games
PlayStation (console) games
PlayStation (console)-only games
Sierra Entertainment games
You Don't Know Jack (franchise)